Gareth Jones is a professor of urban geography in the Department of Geography and Environment at the London School of Economics (LSE), and an Associate Fellow at the Institute for the Study of the Americas in the School of Advanced Study at the University of London.

Jones is a joint editor of the Journal of Latin American Studies, a member of The British Academy Area Studies Panel for Latin America and the Caribbean, and an invited member of the Advisory Committee of the Centre of Excellence for Statistics on Governance, Public Security and Justice, at the UN Office on Drugs and Crime (Mexico).

Jones has edited and authored of a number of books, as well as many academic articles. His most recent book as editor (2009) is Youth Violence in Latin America: Gangs and Juvenile Justice in Perspective (edited with D. Rodgers). His most recent co-authored book (2010) is Bringing Youth into Development. He also has an advance contract with Temple University Press for a book tentatively titled Street Corners in a Global World: Everyday Life and Identities of Mexican Street Youth.

His research interests are urban geography, international development, youth, gated communities, gentrification, and identity. He has conducted research in Mexico, Colombia, Ecuador, Brazil, Ghana, and South Africa.

References

External links 
 LSE Research and Expertise page – including list of publications
 LSE Department of Geography and Environment Profile Page
Google Scholar Report

See also

 Geography
 Human geography
 List of geographers

Living people
Academic journal editors
Academics of the London School of Economics
British male writers
Year of birth missing (living people)